Chen Chien-jen  (born 6 June 1951) is a Taiwanese epidemiologist and politician who has served as the premier of the Republic of China (Taiwan) since 2023. He joined the Chen Shui-bian presidential administration in 2003 as leader of the Department of Health, serving through 2005. He later headed the National Science Council between 2006 and 2008. Chen then served as a vice president of Academia Sinica from 2011 to 2015. Later that year, Chen joined Tsai Ing-wen on the Democratic Progressive Party presidential ticket and served as Vice President of the Republic of China from 2016 to 2020. Chen joined the DPP in 2022 and was appointed premier in January 2023.

He was a member of the Board of Trustees of Fu Jen Catholic University before running for the presidential election and served as Fu Jen's Robert J. Ronald Chair Professor after leaving office.

Early and personal life
Chen Chien-jen was born at his family home in Cishan, Kaohsiung County, in 1951, as one of eight children. His father, Chen Hsin-an, served as Kaohsiung County Magistrate from 1954 to 1957. Chen's mother Chen Wei Lien-chih managed a daycare. Chen is married to Lo Fong-ping, whose family is from Nanjing.

Chen Chien-jen is a devout Catholic. Chen and his wife were invited to visit the Vatican several times by popes John Paul II, Benedict XVI, and Francis. He has been invested as a Knight of the Equestrian of the Holy Sepulchre of Jerusalem (2010) and a Knight of the Pontifical Equestrian Order of St. Gregory the Great (2013). He served on the board of trustees of Fu Jen Catholic University.

Career as researcher
Chen obtained a master's degree in public health from the National Taiwan University, and received his Sc.D in human genetics and epidemiology from Johns Hopkins University in 1977 and 1982, respectively. He began his medical career by researching hepatitis B, and helped raise awareness about vaccination for the disease in Taiwan. The arsenic research lead to the revision of international health standards for arsenic exposure. Between 2011 and November 2015, Chen was a vice president of Academia Sinica.

Political career
Chen served as Minister of Health from 2003 to 2005. As health minister, he was praised for effectively managing the SARS epidemic through quarantine and screening procedures, despite Taiwan's non-membership in the World Health Organization complicating the coordination of research efforts. His successor Hou Sheng-mao credited Chen with reforming the National Health Insurance program. Chen led the National Science Council from 2006 to 2008.

Vice presidency
On 16 November 2015, Chen was confirmed as the running mate for Tsai Ing-wen in the 2016 Taiwanese presidential election after media speculation earlier in the month. During the campaign, Chen became known by the nickname Brother Da-jen, after a character portrayed by Chen Bolin on the romantic drama In Time with You. Chen is the first Catholic vice presidential nominee in Taiwan. On 16 January 2016, Tsai and Chen won the presidential election in a landslide. Chen took up his post as Vice President on 20 May 2016.

In March 2019, Chen announced that he would not seek a second term as vice president alongside Tsai. Chen received international attention for his role in leading Taiwan's response to the COVID-19 pandemic due to his unique position as both vice president and his epidemiologist background. Days before he stepped down from the vice presidency, Chen stated that he would return to the Academia Sinica as a research fellow and thus forgo the pension connected to his political office.

Support for same-sex marriage
On May 17, 2019, the Legislative Yuan approved the same-sex marriage bill, Chen supported it by writing "The Executive Yuan has courageously assumed its responsibility, exercised its utmost wisdom and patience, and continuously communicated and coordinated with the pro and con sides in an effort to reduce social disagreements, proposing a bill that is consistent with the conclusion of the Justice's interpretation of the Constitution and responsive to the majority opinion of the referendum. In the face of the tensions between the pro and con sides, the legislators still uphold the democratic spirit of accommodating diverse opinions and complete the legislative work of the bill smoothly".

Premiership 
In December 2021, Chen applied to join the Democratic Progressive Party, and formally became a member in February 2022. In January 2023, he rejoined the Tsai administration as premier of the Republic of China, taking office on January 31.

Honours and awards
 2005  (Life Sciences)
 2009 Officier of the Ordre des Palmes académiques (France)
 2010 Knight of the Order of St. Gregory the Great (Vatican)
 2013 Knight of the Order of the Holy Sepulchre (Vatican)
 2017 Foreign associate of the National Academy of Sciences (USA)
 2020 Order of Dr. Sun Yat-sen with Grand Cordon
 2020 Honorary Doctorate from National Sun Yat-sen University
2021 Member of the Pontifical Academy of Sciences (Vatican)

References

External links 
 

|-

|-

|-

|-

1951 births
Living people
National Taiwan University alumni
Johns Hopkins University alumni
Taiwanese Roman Catholics
Officiers of the Ordre des Palmes Académiques
Premiers of the Republic of China on Taiwan
Vice presidents of the Republic of China on Taiwan
Politicians of the Republic of China on Taiwan from Kaohsiung
Taiwanese Ministers of Health and Welfare
Knights of St. Gregory the Great
Knights of the Holy Sepulchre
Taiwanese epidemiologists
Academic staff of the National Taiwan University
Tulane University faculty
Johns Hopkins Bloomberg School of Public Health
Foreign associates of the National Academy of Sciences
Academic staff of Fu Jen Catholic University
Members of the Pontifical Academy of Sciences